Vesenny is a rural locality (a settlement) in Pochepsky District, Bryansk Oblast, Russia. The population was 192 as of 2010. There are 3 streets.

Geography 
Vesenny is located 25 km northeast of Pochep (the district's administrative centre) by road. Dom Otdykha is the nearest rural locality.

References 

Rural localities in Pochepsky District